Vicente Calderón Pérez-Cavada (27 May 1913  – 24 March 1987) was a businessman and president of Atlético Madrid for 20 years.

As President of Atlético Madrid he helped in getting their new stadium built, and in 1971 it was renamed Estadio Vicente Calderón in his honour.

References

1913 births
1987 deaths
People from Torrelavega
Spanish bankers
Businesspeople from Cantabria
Atlético Madrid presidents